Carlinville High School is a public high school located in Carlinville, Illinois that serves students from the surrounding areas of Carlinville, Chesterfield, Standard City, Atwater, and Plainview.

History
A portion of the school was destroyed by fire on September 13, 1987. Despite this devastating fire, students were able to resume classes two days later, and the school continues to operate to this day.

Academics 
Carlinville High School is a 2015 U.S. News Best High Schools Silver Medal winner, ranked as the 83rd best high school in Illinois.
The school has a student-teacher ratio of 14:1. The average class size is 17.
The school had a 4-year graduation rate of 81% in 2014, lower than the state average of 86%. The 2014 5-year graduation rate was 88%.
The school's 2014 graduating class had an average ACT Composite score of 22. In 2014, 57% of students scored at least a 21 on the ACT, the state's college readiness benchmark.

Currently, the school offers 7 Advanced Placement courses: AP Biology, AP Calculus AB, AP Chemistry, AP English Language and Composition, AP English Literature and Composition, AP Psychology, and AP United States History. In addition, the school offers 27 dual credit courses through Lewis and Clark Community College.

Athletics & Activities

Boys Athletics
 Baseball
 Basketball
 Cross Country
 Football
 Golf
 Soccer
 Track & Field
 Wrestling 

Girls Athletics
 Basketball
 Cross Country
 Cheerleading
 Dance
 Golf
 Softball
 Soccer
 Track & Field
 Volleyball 

Activities
 Band
 Marching Cavaliers
 Choir
 National FFA Organization
 Scholastic Bowl
 All-School Musical
 Student Council
 Worldwide Youth in Science and Engineering
 Model United Nations
 Family, Career and Community Leaders of America
 Envirothon
 Math Team

External links
 https://web.archive.org/web/20150506080835/http://www.edline.net/pages/Carlinville_High_School
 https://web.archive.org/web/20150824190658/http://www.eteamz.com/cavies/

References

Public high schools in Illinois
Schools in Macoupin County, Illinois
Education in Macoupin County, Illinois